Gustaf Lövås (born Karl Gustaf Andersson; 28 December 1894 – 10 November 1968) was a Swedish stage and film actor. Many of his later screen appearances were in the long-running Åsa-Nisse series in which he played the recurring character Sjökvist.

Selected filmography
 Her Little Majesty (1925)
 Uncle Frans (1926)
 The Queen of Pellagonia (1927)
 Dante's Mysteries (1931)
 Boman's Boy (1933)
 Andersson's Kalle (1934)
 Just a Bugler (1938)
 We at Solglantan (1939)
 Her Melody (1940)
 Kiss Her! (1940)
 The Green Lift (1944)
 Song of Stockholm (1947)
 Lars Hård (1948)
 Åsa-Nisse (1949)
 Vagabond Blacksmiths (1949)
 Father Bom (1949)
 Pippi Longstocking (1949)
 Åsa-Nisse Goes Hunting (1950)
 Kalle Karlsson of Jularbo (1952)
 Åsa-Nisse on Holiday (1953)
 Our Father and the Gypsy (1954)
 Åsa-Nisse in Military Uniform (1958)
 Åsa-Nisse as a Policeman (1960)
 Sailors (1964)

References

Bibliography
 Gustafsson, Tommy. Masculinity in the Golden Age of Swedish Cinema: A Cultural Analysis of 1920s Films. McFarland, 2014.

External links

1894 births
1968 deaths
Swedish male film actors
Swedish male silent film actors
Swedish male stage actors
20th-century Swedish male actors
People from Katrineholm Municipality